Fully Formed Entertainment is an American film production company started in 2018 by Brad Fuller and Andrew Form, who also co-founded Platinum Dunes with Michael Bay.

History 
Fully Formed Entertainment was founded in 2018 when the company signed a three-year, first-look non-exclusive deal with Paramount Pictures to produce its feature films, coming off the success of A Quiet Place.

On November 22, 2019, they hired Alex Ginno as the head of the film department of the company.

In 2020, Andrew Form left the company to join Sunday Night Productions, with Fuller planning to "to venture on his own as a producer."

Filmography

References 

Companies based in Los Angeles
American companies established in 2018
Film production companies of the United States
2018 establishments in California
Mass media companies established in 2018